This is a list of singles that have peaked in the Top 10 of the Billboard Hot 100 during 2010 (see 2010 in music). The date is when the song entered the top 10 for the first time.

Fifty-seven singles reached the top ten in 2010. Fifty acts scored a US top ten hit during the year, with nineteen acts reaching the top ten for the first time either as a lead artist or featured artist.

Kesha scored six top-ten singles during the year—"Tik Tok" (entered the top 10 on November 28, 2009), "Blah Blah Blah" (featuring 3OH!3), "Your Love Is My Drug", "My First Kiss" (3OH!3 featuring Kesha), "Take It Off", and "We R Who We R"—the most among all other artists. She is also the 11th female solo artist to garner four top-ten songs from a debut album. Rihanna had the second most top-ten singles in 2010, with five.

The single with the longest run in the top ten was "Just the Way You Are" by Bruno Mars which was his debut single, spending twenty-two consecutive weeks in the top ten. It spent four consecutive weeks at number one. The longest time that a 2010 single spent at number one was nine weeks by "Tik Tok" by Kesha, and seven weeks by "Love the Way You Lie" by Eminem featuring Rihanna. Train and The Black Eyed Peas were the only bands to get a top 10 single. "Hey, Soul Sister" by Train spent 19 weeks in the top 10 and spent a total of 55 weeks on the Hot 100.

Top-ten singles 

Key
 – indicates single's top 10 entry was also its Hot 100 debut
 – indicates Best performing song of the year
(#) – 2010 year-end top 10 single position and rank
 
Notes:
  The single re-entered the Top 10 on the week ending 12 June 2010.
  The single re-entered the Top 10 on the week ending 17 April 2010.
  The single re-entered the Top 10 on the week ending 26 June 2010.
  The single re-entered the Top 10 on the week ending 17 July 2010.
  The single re-entered the Top 10 on the week ending 21 August 2010.
  The single re-entered the Top 10 on the week ending 11 September 2010.
  The single re-entered the Top 10 on the week ending 18 December 2010.

2009 peaks

2011 peaks

See also
2010 in music
List of Billboard Hot 100 number-one singles of 2010
Billboard Year-End Hot 100 singles of 2010

References

General sources

Additional information obtained can be verified within Billboard's online archive services and print editions of the magazine.

External links
Billboard.com

2010
United States Hot 100 Top 10 Singles